St. Paul's Church, Newport may refer to:

St. Paul's Church, Newport (South Wales)
St. Paul's Church, Newport (Isle of Wight)